The 22947 / 22948 Surat–Bhagalpur Express is a Superfast train running between  of Gujarat and  of Bihar. It is also known as Tapti Ganga Superfast Express.

It operates as train number 22947 from Surat to Bhagalpur Junction and as train number 22948 in the reverse direction, serving the states of Gujarat, Maharashtra, Madhya Pradesh, Uttar Pradesh and Bihar

Coach composition

The train consists of 22 coaches:

 2 AC II Tier
 6 AC III Tier
 8 Sleeper class
 1 Pantry car
 3 General Unreserved
 1 EOG cum Luggage Rake
 1 Seating cum Luggage Rake

Services

22947 Surat–Bhagalpur Tapti Ganga Superfast Express covers the distance of 1822 km in 33 hours 10 mins (55 km/hr) & in 33 hours 15 mins as 22948 Bhagalpur–Surat Tapti Ganga Superfast Express (55 km/hr).

Route

Rake sharing

The train shares its rake with 19045/19046 Tapti Ganga Express

Traction

Both trains are hauled by a Vadodara-based WAP-7 locomotive on its entire journey.

See also

 Shramik Express
 Udhna–Banaras Express
 Udhna–Danapur Express
 Jaynagar–Udhna Antyodaya Express

References

Express trains in India
Rail transport in Bihar
Rail transport in Gujarat
Rail transport in Uttar Pradesh
Rail transport in Madhya Pradesh
Transport in Surat
Transport in Bhagalpur